The Southernmost Point Buoy is an anchored concrete buoy in Key West, Florida, marking the southernmost point in the continental United States, the lowest latitude land of contiguous North American states. It is 18 feet above sea level. The large painted buoy was established as a tourist attraction in 1983 by the city at the corner of South Street and Whitehead Street.

The southernmost point was originally marked with a small sign, before the City of Key West erected the now famous concrete buoy in 1983. The concrete buoy has overall withstood several hurricanes and is a gathering place for photographs and tourists. The paint job was damaged by Hurricane Irma in September 2017, but it was refurbished later that year by the original artist. Cuba is roughly 90 miles south of this point in Key West, although this was not originally on the marker, but rather on a smaller sign next to marker.

Description

Before the concrete buoy there was a wooden sign that noted the southern point at this spot. The old wood sign as of 1970 only said "The Southernmost Point, of Southernmost City, Key West Fla." By 1982 this had changed to "The Southernmost Point, In USA, Key West Fla". There was separate sign on a nearby fence in that area, with an arrow pointing south (in this case to the left) with the text "90 Miles to Cuba".

The buoy is maintained by the Key West Public Works Department and it was dedicated on September 10, 1983. The painted concrete buoy is 12 feet tall and 7 feet wide.

Next to the marker is a cement telegraph hut. This hut housed an underwater telephone cable that connected Key West to Havana in 1921. The cable hut is a small structure just a little east of the Southernmost marker where the cable went into the sea.

As of 2011, the buoy is inscribed: "The Conch Republic. 90 Miles to Cuba, Southernmost Point Continental U.S.A., Key West, F.L., Home of the Sunset". The buoy was refurbished in 2005. The phrases "90 miles to Cuba" and "Home of the Sunset" were not on the 1986 paint job.

In November 1983, the text did not include the line "90 miles to Cuba", which was still written on a smaller sign on fence next to the buoy. Next to the buoy, also as of November 1983, there was a script "America Begins" painted on a curb below the 90 miles to Cuba sign. Also at that time the buoy did not include the text "Home of the Sunset". (see also Mallory Square, which hosts Key West sunset celebration)

By the 2010s, there was a webcam that relays video of the street corner where the buoy is located to the Internet.

The buoy paint job was done by local painter-artist Danny Acosta, and the City of Key West hired him to paint again after it was damaged by Hurricane Irma in 2017.

On New Year's Day 2022, the buoy was vandalized, resulting in "extensive damages." There was a camera operated by Two Oceans Digital that helped find the vandals, both of the two vandals faced over $1,000 in damages for criminal mischief.

Accuracy

A more southern part of Key West Island exists and is publicly accessible: the beach area of Fort Zachary Taylor Historic State Park at approximately 24°32'42.2"N 81°48'34.5"W, and approximately  farther south than the marker. Also, all eight major islands of Hawaii entirely lie to the south of Key West (see Ka Lae, on the Big Island).

Further south, land on the Truman Annex property, just west-southwest of the buoy, is the true southernmost point on the island (approximately  farther south near 24°32'39.2"N 81°48'17.8"W), but it has no marker since it is U.S. Navy property and cannot be entered by civilian tourists.

Finally, the true southernmost point in Florida (as well as in the continental United States) is actually 10 miles away at Ballast Key (24°31'15.9"N 81°57'49.5"W), an island south and west of Key West.

The claim on the buoy stating "90 miles to Cuba" may be a rounded number, since Cuba, at its closest point is 94 statute (81 nautical) miles due south. One book author suggests they meant 90 nautical miles, from a distance of 103 statute ('regular') miles measuring from Key West to Havana, Cuba.

In popular culture
In Callahan's Key (2001) by Spider Robinson the monument is mentioned in the line "The famous, oft-photographed marker at The Southernmost Point which is not."

A subplot of Robert Tacoma's second novel, Key Weirder (2005), involves an interstate dispute over where the true southernmost point is located, and, therefore, where the monument should be placed.

See also
 Cape Sable (Southernmost of the Florida peninsula (Non-island))
 Palmyra Atoll (Southernmost incorporated territory) (5 degrees above equator)

References

External links

 Picture of buoy after Irma from Twitter
 Southernmost points photo by Florida memory archive
 1982 Wood sign
 1970 Wood sign

1983 establishments in Florida
Buildings and structures in Key West, Florida
Landmarks in Key West, Florida
Tourist attractions in Key West, Florida